Pelecyodon is an extinct genus of ground sloths from the Early Miocene (Santacrucian) of South America. Fossils have been found in the Santa Cruz Formation in Argentina.

References 

Prehistoric sloths
Miocene xenarthrans
Miocene mammals of South America
Santacrucian
Neogene Argentina
Fossils of Argentina
Fossil taxa described in 1891
Taxa named by Florentino Ameghino